"Get Up" is a song recorded by American singer and songwriter Amel Larrieux. It was released on October 5, 1999 as the lead single from her debut solo studio album, Infinite Possibilities (2000). It was written by Nelly Furtado, Larrieux and her husband, Lura Larrieux.

"Get Up" managed to enter the Billboard Hot 100 chart, peaking at number 97 and remains as Larrieux's only entry on the chart as a solo singer.

Track listing
CD, digital download, and streaming
"Get Up"
"Get Up (Instrumental)"

12-inch
"Get Up"
"Get Up (Instrumental)"
"Get Up (Accapella)"

Remixes 12-inch
"Get Up (Remix) [featuring Puerto Rock]"
"Get Up (Livin' Proof Instrumental)"
"Get Up (Thread Had Fun Main Mix) [featuring Mos Def]"
"Get Up (Ron Trent Vox Mix 1)"
"Get Up (Dance Radio Mix)"

Charts

References

1999 debut singles
1999 songs
Neo soul songs
Epic Records singles